Nicotinamide mononucleotide adenylyltransferase 3 (NMNAT3) is an enzyme that in humans is encoded by the NMNAT3 gene.

NMNAT3 is the third of three protein isoforms of nicotinamide-nucleotide adenylyltransferase (NMNAT) found in humans. As with the other NMNATs, NMNAT3 is an enzyme that catalyzes nicotinamide adenine dinucleotide (NAD) synthesis. NMNAT3 levels are highest in liver, heart, skeletal muscle, and erythrocytes.

NMNAT3 is localized in mitochondria or cytoplasm, depending upon the cell type.  Knockdown of NMNAT3 gene expression in cell culture strongly reduces mitochondrial function. NMNAT3 is essential for maintaining NAD in red blood cells.

The catechin epigallocatechin gallate found in tea  can activate NMNAT3 by more than 40%.

As of 2017 mutations in the NMNAT3 gene have not been associated with any known disease.

References

Molecular biology